The Benjamin Wilcox House, at 315 The Alameda in San Juan Bautista, California, was built in 1858. It was listed on the National Register of Historic Places in 1982.

It was designed by local builder George Chalmers in Gothic Revival style.  It is a clapboarded balloon-frame L-shaped house built with redwood floor joists and sawn redwood studs.  It has split pillars with Tuscan-order capitals, somehow involving fleur-de-lis.

References

External links

National Register of Historic Places in San Benito County, California
Gothic Revival architecture in California
Buildings and structures completed in 1858